The 2021 L'Open 35 de Saint-Malo was a professional tennis tournament played on outdoor clay courts. It was the twenty-sixth edition of the tournament and its first as part of the 2021 edition of the WTA 125K series. It took place in Saint-Malo, France between 3 and 9 May 2021.

Singles main-draw entrants

Seeds

 1 Rankings are as of 26 April 2021.

Other entrants
The following players received wildcards into the singles main draw:
  Clara Burel
  Elsa Jacquemot
  Diane Parry
  Harmony Tan

The following players received entry from the qualifying draw:
  Tessah Andrianjafitrimo
  Luisa Stefani 
  Clara Tauson
  Viktoriya Tomova

The following player received entry as a lucky loser:
  Amandine Hesse

Withdrawals 
Before the tournament
  Paula Badosa → replaced by  Greet Minnen
  Irina-Camelia Begu → replaced by  Aliona Bolsova
  Anna Blinkova → replaced by  Varvara Gracheva
  Lauren Davis → replaced by  Martina Trevisan
  Zarina Diyas → replaced by  Anna Kalinskaya
  Misaki Doi → replaced by  Anna Karolína Schmiedlová
  Caroline Garcia → replaced by  Aliaksandra Sasnovich
  Camila Giorgi → replaced by  Kateryna Kozlova
  Polona Hercog → replaced by  Océane Dodin
  Nao Hibino → replaced by  Amandine Hesse
  Kaia Kanepi → replaced by  Tereza Martincová
  Danka Kovinić → replaced by  Jasmine Paolini
  Laura Siegemund → replaced by  Wang Xiyu

Doubles main-draw entrants

Seeds 

 1 Rankings as of April 26, 2021.

Champions

Singles

  Viktorija Golubic def.  Jasmine Paolini, 6–1, 6–3

Doubles

  Kaitlyn Christian /  Sabrina Santamaria def.  Hayley Carter /  Luisa Stefani, 7–6(7–4), 4–6, [10–5]

References

External links
 Official website

2021 WTA 125 tournaments
2021 in French tennis
May 2021 sports events in France
2021 L'Open 35 de Saint-Malo